is a series of Japanese shoot 'em up video games developed by the dōjin circle  (formerly FLAT). The first game, eXceed, was released in 2005, and the latest game, eXceed3rd JADE PENETRATE BLACK PACKAGE, was released in 2009. The series is localized into English and published by Nyu Media.

eXceed - Gun Bullet Children 
The first game of the series. It was released at the Comiket 69 in December 2005. A remake version has never been released.

eXceed 2nd - Vampire REX 
The second game of the series. It was released in 2006. Only one character is playable, . The eXceed 2rd -Vampire REX is a remake version of the second game, developed by Tennen-sozai (branched from FLAT) in December 2007.

eXceed 3rd - JADE PENETRATE - 
The third game of the series. It was developed by Tennen-sozai and released in August 2007. Only one character is playable, . Some famous Japanese voice actresses worked on this game; Yukari Tamura, Nana Mizuki and Shizuka Itō. Sound tracks were composed by the dōjin circle . The eXceed 3rd -JADE PENETRATE BLACK PACKAGE is an expanded version of the third game, released in December 2009. In 2015, it was also released on an online store by Hangame.

References

External links 
 Official website 

Doujin video games
Indie video games
Scrolling shooters
Video games featuring female protagonists